Oughterside and Allerby is a civil parish in the Borough of Allerdale in Cumbria, England.  It contains three listed buildings that are recorded in the National Heritage List for England.  All the listed buildings are designated at Grade II, the lowest of the three grades, which is applied to "buildings of national importance and special interest".  The parish is almost entirely rural, and the listed buildings consist of a bridge, a milestone, and a horse trough.


Buildings

References

Citations

Sources

Lists of listed buildings in Cumbria